The Sunday Times Rich List 2020 is the 32nd annual survey of the wealthiest people resident in the United Kingdom, published by The Sunday Times on 17 May 2020.

The List was edited by Robert Watts who succeeded long-term compiler Philip Beresford in 2017.

The List was previewed in the previous week's Sunday Times and widely reported by other media.

Top 20 fortunes

See also 
 Forbes list of billionaires

References

External links 
 Sunday Times Rich List

Sunday Times Rich List
2020 in the United Kingdom